Sir Alan Edgar Walker  (4 June 191129 January 2003) was an Australian theologian, evangelist, social commentator, broadcaster and activist, and the Superintendent of Wesley Mission (formerly the Central Methodist Mission).

Career
Alan Walker was involved in the formation of the World Council of Churches in 1948. He was superintendent of the Methodist (later Uniting Church in Australia) Wesley Mission, Pitt Street, Sydney, 1958–1978 and one of the founders of the National Christian Youth Convention (NCYC) in 1955 and Lifeline in 1963. He was first world director of evangelism for the World Methodist Council, 1978 to 1988. He was involved in founding the World Methodist Evangelism Institute (located at the United Methodist-related Candler School of Theology at Emory University) in Atlanta, 1982. He was principal of the Pacific College of Evangelism, now the Alan Walker College of Evangelism, in Sydney, 1989-1995. Following the closure of the Alan Walker College the Uniting Theological College in Sydney has been home to the Alan Walker Lectureship in Mission and Evangelism.

Lifeline
Walker launched Lifeline in Sydney, Australia in 1963 after a call from a distressed man who three days later killed himself. Walker launched a crisis line which initially operated out of the Methodist Central Mission in Sydney.

Lifeline Sydney was two years in planning and preparation, with 150 people attending a nine-month training course to work at the Centre. A century old, dilapidated building owned by the Mission, on the fringes of downtown Sydney was renovated for the purposes of this new support centre. A staff of full-time employees was appointed to direct the work of these new telephone crisis support workers. The Director General of Post and Telephone Services authorised that this crisis support service should be listed on the Emergency Page of the Telephone Directory and the phones were installed.

March 1963 saw the opening of the first official Lifeline Centre. The initiative was well received with over 100 calls for help being answered on the first day. In its 50th year, Lifeline had over 11,000 volunteers and spoke to more than 500,000 people in crisis annually.(Lifeline Australia Annual Report 2011/12)

Honours and awards
 1955: Officer of the Order of the British Empire (OBE) 
 1981: Knight Bachelor
 1986: World Methodist Peace Award
 1997: Named as one of 100 people as an Australian Living Treasure
 2001: Centenary Medal

Personal life
Walker was born in Sydney, New South Wales on 4 June 1911 to the Reverend Alfred Edgar Walker (1877—1966) and Violet Louisa Walker (née Lavis) (1881—1971). He was married to Winifred Walker (later Lady Walker) (1916–2006) and they had four children, Lynette Sue, Rev Bruce Walker, David Walker and Rev Christopher Walker. He died in 2003, at an aged care centre on Sydney's North Shore, aged 91.

Biographies
 Don Wright, Alan Walker: Conscience of the Nation, Sydney: Open Book Publishers, 1997. .
 Harold Henderson, Reach for the World: The Alan Walker Story, Nashville, Tennessee: Discipleship Resources, 1981.

References

External links
 Alan Walker College of Evangelism
 Sir Alan Walker, World Methodist evangelist, dies at 91, World Faith Network
 Alan Walker Remembered, ABC Radio International's The Religion Report
 Alan Walker: A Many-Faceted Man Of God, John Mark Ministries
 'A Study in Word and Deed' (Harold Henderson's eulogy for the Reverend Sir Alan Walker, Wesley Centre, Sydney, 11 February 2003)
 The Reverend Sir Alan Walker, The Daily Telegraph, 31 January 2003

1911 births
2003 deaths
Arminian theologians
Arminian ministers
Australian Christian theologians
Australian Knights Bachelor
Australian Methodist ministers
Australian Officers of the Order of the British Empire
Australian Protestant religious leaders
Methodist evangelists
Methodist theologians
Recipients of the Centenary Medal
Uniting Church in Australia people